Three vessels of the Royal Navy have been named HMS Faversham after Faversham:
  was a 40-gun 1706 Establishment frigate launched in 1712. She was broken up at Portsmouth in 1730.
  was a 44-gun 1733 Establishment frigate launched in 1741. She was sold in 1749.
  was a  launched in 1918. She was sold in 1927 and broken up at Charlestown in 1928.

See also

References 

 

Royal Navy ship names